Tania Saleh (born March 11, 1969) is a Lebanese singer-songwriter who has been prominent in the Arabic independent musical scene since 1990.

Early life

Tania Saleh is a Lebanese singer/songwriter and visual artist. She is considered as one of the founders of the Arabic independent alternative musical scene in Lebanon and the Arab world. Her voice is a soft mix between traditional Arabic music and western sounds. Her lyrics address social and political turmoil. Saleh was six years old when Lebanese civil war began.  

Since her early debut in 1990, she has experimented with various musical genres, which has resulted in a fresh and original mix of Lebanese music flavored with folk, alternative rock, bossa nova, jazz and most recently electronic music. 

Alex Bessos encountered Saleh while searching for a lead vocalist for his band Minus Infinitee. Bessos expressed his interest in Saleh's voice and invited her to audition. Her first live performance was in 1986 at the West Hall of the American University of Beirut. Saleh's time with Minus Infinitee ended when Bessos emigrated to the United States.

Childhood

Her childhood and teenage years were affected tremendously by her parent's divorce, the civil war and that her mother was raising her two daughters alone. She had to start working at an early age to help support the family. At 17, she sang in various choirs, wrote jingles for radio commercials and worked as a freelance illustrator and graphic designer.

Education

Saleh enrolled in The Lebanese American University to study Fine Arts but music was always her first love. While in college, she joined many rock bands in search for her own style. Sometimes she had to cross the border between East and West Beirut to do her rehearsals with the musicians. 

In 1990, after the civil war ended, she left to Paris to get her master's degree in "Arts Plastiques". She lived in a boat on the Seine river and fell in love with the beauty of the city.

Television and advertising

Between 1992 and 2014, she applied her passion for the arts in the world of television where, for two years, she experimented with image and sound, created illustrations, animations, video art and wrote music jingles for Future Television.
Later, she drowned in the world of advertising which was a new creative school that opened a new horizon on audio-visual and conceptual experimentation.

Collaboration with Ziad Rahbany

She auditioned for an upcoming play by Ziad Rahbany, a famous Lebanese music composer/lyricist/pianist and playwright. She acted and sang live in two consecutive plays, "Bikhsous el Karameh Wil Shaab el Anid" and "Lawla Foushat el Amal" between 1993 and 1996, and contributed backing vocals recording on two cult albums (to which she also designed the album covers for), "Bema Enno" (with the late singer Joseph Sakr) and "Ila Assy" (a tribute to Assy Rahbany by Fairouz).

Career

First & Second album

In 1997, Tania started to work on her solo album "Tania Saleh" (co-produced by sound engineer/music producer Philippe Tohmé) in collaboration with music veteran Issam Hajali ("Al Ard" band). She recorded her first album songs at Notta Studio with Philippe Tohmé. Ziad Rahbany played piano on two of her tracks, her first single, "Al Ozone" (appeared as an exclusive music video on Future Television Lebanon in 1997) and "Habibi" (written by Issam Hajali, appeared on her first album "Tania Saleh" released in 2002). The album was not considered a mainstream success, but Saleh started an independent musical movement especially with the growth of the internet community in the Arab world. 
On April 13, 2011, she released her second studio album "Wehde" (co-produced by Philippe Tohmé). The album immediately became number 1 on the TOP 10 list of best selling albums at Virgin Megastore, Beirut and accompanied the winds of change throughout the Arab World.

Early Collaborations

In 2006, she wrote the lyrics to Natacha Atlas' song "Communicate" released on Lebanese band Blend's one and only album "Act One". In 2010, she was featured on Al Jazeera Television in "Next Music Station", a documentary by musician /filmmaker Fermin Muguruza who painted a 'soundscape' of the modern independent Arab music scene. The film was screened in Studio 39, New York the next year. Her first trip to the U.S.A. was hosted by music producer Miles Copeland who chose her as one of the main Arab artists portrayed in the PBS-produced musical documentary entitled: "Dissonance and Harmony/Arab Music Goes West". The documentary was preceded by a five-day musical workshop uniting American and Arab artists at SIR studios in Los Angeles. It was directed by Jon Brandeis and aired on PBS, BBC, Al Jazeera and Al Hurra. The result of this workshop/documentary was the songs: "Slow Down" (released as a single and on the compilation "Desert Roses5") and the song "Had There Been a Dream" (released on the compilation "Bagdad Heavy Metal") both produced by Miles Copeland between 2006 and 2009. Copeland mentioned his collaboration with Saleh in his autobiographical book "Two Steps Forward, One Step Back" released in 2021.

Collaboration with Nadine Labaki

In 2007, she wrote the lyrics to "Mreyte Ya Mreyte", the title song in Lebanese director Nadine Labaki's first feature film "Caramel", composed by Khaled Mouzannar. 
She wrote the lyrics and coached the singers in Khaled Mouzannar's soundtrack for Nadine Labaki's second feature film "Where Do We Go Now?" released worldwide in September 2011. The film soundtrack was distributed worldwide. It won the "Best Music Award" at the Stockholm International Film Festival in November 2011.

Live albums

In 2012, she released her first live album containing songs from Khaled Mouzannar's film soundtracks that she had written the lyrics for and three previously unreleased songs. The album was entitled "Tania Saleh Live at DRM" and released in December of the same year. Her second live album EP "Tania Saleh Live in Barcelona" was released in 2020.

Lebanese Festivals

She opened the Byblos International Festival in 2002, the Beirut Spring Festival in May 2013 and was chosen by The Baalbeck International Festival to perform at the temple of Bacchus in 2014. She also shared the stage as a guest with Lebanese trumpet player and composer Ibrahim Maalouf at the Byblos International Festival the same year.

Independence

She is still working independently, without a proper manager or booking agency, and has performed live at UNESCO and Institut du Monde Arabe (France), Dubai Expo 2020 (UAE), Cairo Opera House (Egypt), the Barbican Centre (UK), The Nobel Peace Centre, Freezone Festival, Woman's Voices Festival, The Oslo World Festival (Norway), The Roxy & Arlington Festival (USA), Kulturhuset Stadsteatern and Stallet (Sweden) and many others. 

Her musical collaborations are very eclectic: Ziad Rahbany, Toufic Farroukh, Issam Hajali, Charbel Rouhana, Ibrahim Maalouf, Rayess Bek, Khaled Mouzannar, RZA, Nile Rodgers, Charlotte Caffey, Tarek El Nasser, Natasha Atlas, Bernd Kurtzke, Erik Hillestad, Anneli Drecker, Mathias Eick, Kjetil Bjerkestrand, Terry Evans, Hazem Shahine, Lisa Nordström, Bugge Wesseltoft, Kari Bremnes, Øyvind Kristiansen, Lina Nyberg & Chinese Man Records. She has also collaborated in musical workshops and residencies in Lebanon, France, Italy, USA, Norway, Sweden, Germany, UAE, Switzerland, Kuwait, and Egypt.

Norwegian producer Erik Hillestad from the label Kirkelig Kulturverksted has co-produced her last three albums, "A Few Images/Algumas Imagens" (2014), "Intersection" (2017) & "10 A.D." (2021).

Personal life

She married music producer/sound engineer Philippe Tohmé and gave birth to Tarek in 1997 and Karim in 2003, who took her away from live performances for more than seven years. In the meantime, she started writing her second album, "Wehde", while still working in the advertising world to make a living and help produce her music. Her marriage to Tohmé ended in 2011, right in the middle of the release of her second album. Her latest album "10 A.D." (written entirely by Saleh) is a journey into a woman's life ten years after divorce.

Discography

Studio albums
"Tania Saleh" - 2002
"Wehde" - 2011
"A Few Images (Algumas Imagens)" - 2014
"Intersection" - 2017
"10 A.D. (10 Years After Divorce)" - 2021

Live albums
"Tania Saleh Live at DRM" - 2012
"Tania Saleh Live in Barcelona" - 2019

Singles
"Al Ozone" (single) - 1997
"Slow Down" (single) - 2006
"Ers El Deek" (single) - 2007
"Ya Ghosna Naqa" (collaboration with Charbel Rouhana) - 1997
"Ya Baalback" (single) - 2015
"Show Me the Way" Remix (single) - 2020
"Ya Reit/I Wish" (single) - 2020
"In Rah Minnik Ya Ein/Out Of Sight" (single) - 2020
"From Me and You" (collaboration with Sabrine Jenhani & Ghassen Fendri) - 2021
"Sakakeen" (single) - (collaboration with Chinese Man Records) - 2022

Compilation albums
"Desert Roses 5" - 2007 U.S.A.
"Bagdad Heavy Metal" - 2007 U.S.A.
"Radio Beirut" - 2012 Germany
"Sunset in Marrakesh" - 2016 Turkey
"Sunset in Mykonos" - 2016 Turkey
"La Fleur Orientale" - 2016 Turkey
"Songs from a Stolen Spring" - 2014 Norway
"Putumayo-Acoustic Women" - 2019 U.S.A.
"Chinese Man Records-Matteo & Bro" - 2022 France

Collaborations
"Ila Assy" B.V. by Tania Saleh - music by Ziad Rahbany for Fairuz - 1996 Lebanon
"Bema Enno" B.V. by Tania Saleh - music by Ziad Rahbany for Joseph Sakr - 1997 Lebanon
"Salamat" B.V. by Tania Saleh - music by Charbel Rouhana - 1998 Lebanon
"Calipyge / Drab Zeen" lyrics by Tania Saleh - music by Toufic Farroukh - 2002 Lebanon/France
"Ya Ghosna Naqa / Vice Versa" old poem performed by Tania Saleh - music by Charbel Rouhana - 2003 Lebanon
"Ya Ghosna Naqa / Middle Eastern Oud" old poem performed by Tania Saleh - music by Charbel Rouhana - 2004 Lebanon/U.S.A.
"Act One - featuring Natasha Atlas" lyrics by Tania Saleh - music by Blend - 2004 Lebanon
"Caramel" lyrics by Tania Saleh - music by Khaled Mouzannar - 2005 Lebanon/France
"Dance Cycle / Lord Kanoun" performed by Tania Saleh - music by Iman Homsy - 2006 Lebanon
"Where Do We Go Now" lyrics by Tania Saleh - music by Khaled Mouzannar - 2011 Lebanon/France
"Not A Word Was Spoken" performed by Tania Saleh & Terry Evans - 2014 Norway/U.S.A.
"Rizkallah" lyrics & music & performed by Tania Saleh & Rayess Bek - 2014 Lebanon/France
"Fi Asfour" lyrics by Tania Saleh - music by A. & G. Nehme - performed by Abeer Nehme - 2019
"El Hadouta Nota Nota" lyrics by Tania Saleh - music by Charbel Rouhana - 2022 Lebanon
"Sakakeen" lyrics by Tania Saleh - music by Matteo & Bro/Chinese Man Records - 2022 France

References

External links 
 
listing

1969 births
20th-century Lebanese women singers
Living people
Women singer-songwriters
21st-century Lebanese women singers